The Weights and Measures Act 1972, is a Malaysian laws which enacted to establish units of measurement and standards of mass and measure based on the International System of Units, to regulate weights and measures and instruments for weighing and measuring and to make provisions for matters connected therewith and ancillary thereto.

Structure
The Weights and Measures Act 1972, in its current form (1 January 2009), consists of 5 Parts containing 35 sections and 4 schedules (including 7 amendments).
 Part I: Preliminary
 Part II: Units of Measurement
 Part III: Weights and Measures for Trade Purposes
 Part IV: Administration
 Part V: General
 Schedules

See also
Weights and Measures Act

References

External links
 Weights and Measures Act 1972 

1972 in Malaysian law
Malaysian federal legislation